

2000s

2007 personalities
TBS disclosed its initial roster of postseason announcers on September 21, 2007.

Play-by-play
Chip Caray: #1 Play-by-play
Dick Stockton
Ted Robinson
Don Orsillo

Color commentators
Tony Gwynn: #1 color commentator – 2 Braves games during September 2007
Bob Brenly
Ron Darling
Steve Stone
Joe Simpson
Buck Martinez

Field reporters
David Aldridge
Marc Fein
José Mota
Craig Sager – 2 Braves games in September 2007.

Studio host
Ernie Johnson

Studio analysts
Curtis Granderson – guest analyst
Cal Ripken
John Smoltz – guest analyst
Frank Thomas

2007 playoffs
On January 28, 2007, TBS' executive producer Jeff Behnke said that Chip Caray "is definitely going to be TBS' lead play-by-play announcer for division series and LCS games." Indeed, TBS announced in April 2007 that Baseball Hall of Famer Tony Gwynn, who has experience in broadcasting with ESPN and the San Diego Padres, would join Caray in the booth.

Veteran Braves play-by-play man Skip Caray, Chip's father was vocal about not being part of the coverage in comments he made to The Atlanta Journal-Constitution.

TBS' studio team was Inside the NBA host Ernie Johnson along with the other member of the 2007 Baseball Hall of Fame class, Cal Ripken. On September 24, it was announced that the studio show would also include Frank Thomas, who played for the Toronto Blue Jays during the season. Thomas and other active players such as Curtis Granderson and John Smoltz made guest appearances during the playoffs. The studio coverage is titled Inside MLB.

2008 personalities
In the 2008 season, Chip Caray, Ron Darling, and Buck Martinez formed the lead broadcast crew for Sunday games on TBS.  Darling and Martinez have taken turns as analysts.

Marc Fein, who was the last TBS Braves Baseball studio host, has the same duties here, providing updates throughout the day from other MLB games. Johnson also hosts from time-to-time.

TBS disclosed its initial roster of postseason announcers on September 18, 2008.

Play-by-play
Chip Caray
Dick Stockton – some regular season games and MLB playoffs
Don Orsillo – some regular season games and MLB playoffs
Brian Anderson (first time an announcer broadcast games for the team he was affiliated – the Milwaukee Brewers)

Color commentators
Ron Darling
Buck Martinez
Tony Gwynn – MLB playoffs only
Harold Reynolds – select regular season and MLB playoffs
Joe Simpson – MLB playoffs only
John Smoltz – MLB playoffs only

Field reporters
Tom Verducci
Craig Sager
Marc Fein
David Aldridge

Studio host
Ernie Johnson

Studio analysts
Cal Ripken
Dennis Eckersley
Curtis Granderson – guest analyst

2009 personalities

Play-by-play
Chip Caray 
Don Orsillo – some regular season games and MLB playoffs
Dick Stockton – some regular season games and MLB playoffs
Brian Anderson

Color commentators
Ron Darling
Buck Martinez
David Wells – select Regular season games
Dennis Eckersley – 1 or 2 regular season games 
Bob Brenly – MLB playoffs only
Joe Simpson – MLB playoffs only

Field reporters
Craig Sager
Marc Fein
Tom Verducci
David Aldridge

Studio host
Ernie Johnson

Studio analysts
Dennis Eckersley
Cal Ripken
David Wells

2010s

2010 personalities

Play-by-play
Ernie Johnson
Brian Anderson
Dick Stockton – select Regular season games and MLB playoffs
Don Orsillo

Color commentators
Ron Darling
John Smoltz
Joe Simpson – MLB playoffs only
Bob Brenly – MLB playoffs only
Buck Martinez – MLB playoffs only
Dennis Eckersley – 1 or 2 regular season games
David Wells – select Regular season games

Field reporters
Craig Sager
David Aldridge
Tom Verducci
Marc Fein

Studio host
Matt Winer

Studio analysts
Dennis Eckersley
Cal Ripken
David Wells

2011 personalities

Play-by-play
Brian Anderson
Dick Stockton – select Regular season games and MLB Playoffs
Don Orsillo (Playoffs)
Victor Rojas (Playoffs)
Ernie Johnson – Because of Johnson stepping aside for the 2011 playoffs to care for his son Michael (who suffers from Muscular dystrophy and was placed in intensive care around the same time as the playoffs), Brian Anderson instead called the 2011 National League Championship Series for TBS, which only by coincidence has the Brewers against the Cardinals; his role was announced before the playoff seedings for the NLDS were fully set.
Matt Vasgersian – select Regular season games
Steve Physioc – select Regular Season games

Color commentators
Ron Darling
John Smoltz
Bob Brenly – MLB playoffs only
Buck Martinez – MLB playoffs only
Joe Simpson – MLB playoffs only
Dennis Eckersley – 1 or 2 regular season games
David Wells – select Regular season games

Field reporters
Craig Sager
Tom Verducci
Jaime Maggio
Sam Ryan

Studio host
Matt Winer

Studio analysts
Dennis Eckersley
Cal Ripken
David Wells

2012 personalities

Play-by-play
Ernie Johnson
Brian Anderson
Dick Stockton – select Regular season games and MLB Playoffs
Don Orsillo
Steve Physioc – select Regular season games

Color commentators
Ron Darling
John Smoltz
Cal Ripken – MLB playoffs only
Joe Simpson – MLB playoffs only
Bob Brenly – MLB playoffs only
Buck Martinez – MLB playoffs only
Dennis Eckersley – 1 or 2 regular season games
David Wells – select Regular season games

Field reporters
Craig Sager
Tom Verducci
David Aldridge
Jaime Maggio

Studio host
Matt Winer

Studio analysts
Dennis Eckersley
Cal Ripken
David Wells
Shane Victorino – Guest Analyst

2013 personalities

Play-by-play
Ernie Johnson
Brian Anderson
Dick Stockton – select Regular season games and MLB playoffs
Don Orsillo
Matt Devlin – select Regular season games
Steve Physioc – select Regular season games

Color commentators
Ron Darling
Cal Ripken – MLB playoffs only
John Smoltz
Joe Simpson – MLB playoffs only
Bob Brenly – MLB playoffs only
Dennis Eckersley – select Regular season games and MLB playoffs
Buck Martinez – MLB playoffs only
Tom Verducci

Field reporters
Craig Sager
Rachel Nichols
Matt Winer
David Aldridge

Studio host
Keith Olbermann

Studio analysts
Pedro Martínez
Dirk Hayhurst
Tom Verducci
Mark DeRosa – Guest Analyst
Gary Sheffield
Adam Jones – Guest Analyst

2014 personalities

Play-by-play
Ernie Johnson
Brian Anderson
Dick Stockton – select Regular season games

Color commentators
Ron Darling
Dennis Eckersley – select Regular season games and MLB playoffs
Cal Ripken – MLB playoffs only
Joe Simpson – MLB playoffs only

Field reporters
Matt Winer
Jaime Maggio

Studio host
Casey Stern

Studio analysts
Gary Sheffield
Pedro Martínez
Todd Frazier – Guest Analyst

2015 personalities

Play-by-play
Ernie Johnson
Brian Anderson
Dick Stockton – select Regular season games

Color commentators
Ron Darling
Dennis Eckersley – select Regular season games and MLB playoffs
Cal Ripken – MLB playoffs only
Joe Simpson – MLB playoffs only

Field reporters
Sam Ryan
Matt Winer

Studio host
Casey Stern

Studio analysts
Gary Sheffield
Pedro Martínez
Dusty Baker

2016 personalities

Play-by-play
Ernie Johnson
Brian Anderson
Don Orsillo – select Regular season games

Color commentators
Ron Darling
Dennis Eckersley – select Regular season games and MLB playoffs
Cal Ripken – MLB playoffs only
Joe Simpson – MLB playoffs only

Field reporters
Sam Ryan
Matt Winer

Studio host
Casey Stern

Studio analysts
Gary Sheffield
Pedro Martínez
Jimmy Rollins

2017 personalities

Play-by-play
Ernie Johnson
Brian Anderson
Don Orsillo – select Regular season games

Color commentators
Ron Darling
Dennis Eckersley – select Regular season games and MLB playoffs
Joe Simpson – MLB playoffs only

Field reporters
Sam Ryan
Lauren Shehadi

Studio host
Casey Stern

Studio analysts
Gary Sheffield
Pedro Martínez
Jimmy Rollins

2018 personalities

Play-by-play
Brian Anderson
Don Orsillo – Don Orsillo replaced Johnson on TBS' 2018 ALDS coverage after Johnson announced that he would not cover the Major League Baseball playoffs as a result of his treatment for the blood clots in both of his legs.
Ernie Johnson

Color commentators
Ron Darling
Dennis Eckersley – select Regular season games and MLB playoffs

Field reporters
Lauren Shehadi
Hazel Mae

Studio host
Casey Stern

Studio analysts
Gary Sheffield
Pedro Martínez
Jimmy Rollins

2019 personalities

Play-by-play
Brian Anderson
Don Orsillo – select Regular season games
Ernie Johnson

Color commentators
Ron Darling
Pedro Martínez – select Regular season games
Jeff Francoeur – MLB playoffs only

Field reporters
Lauren Shehadi 
Alex Chappell
Emily Jones – Pre and Postgame Show – (2019 NLDS)
Hazel Mae – Pre and Postgame Show – (2019 NLDS)

Studio host
Casey Stern

Studio analysts
Gary Sheffield
Pedro Martínez
Jimmy Rollins – color commentator for select regular season games
Curtis Granderson – NLCS only

2020s

2020 personalities

Play-by-play
Brian Anderson – Division Series and Championship Series playoffs
Don Orsillo – Division Series playoffs
Rich Waltz – select regular season games and Wild Card series
Ernie Johnson – select Regular season games
Joe Simpson – most regular season games

Color commentators
Ron Darling – most regular season games, Division Series, and Championship Series playoffs
Jeff Francoeur – Division Series and Championship Series playoffs
Jimmy Rollins – select regular season games and Wild Card series
Joe Simpson – select Regular season games

Field reporters
Lauren Shehadi 
Matt Winer

Studio host
Ernie Johnson

Studio analysts
Jimmy Rollins
Pedro Martínez
Curtis Granderson

2021 personalities

Play-by-play
Brian Anderson – most Regular season games, Wild Card series, Division Series and Championship Series playoffs
Don Orsillo – select Regular season games and Division Series playoffs
Matt Winer – select regular season games

Color commentators
Ron Darling – most regular season games, Wild Card series, Division Series, and Championship Series playoffs
Jeff Francoeur – Division Series and Championship Series playoffs and select regular season games.
Jimmy Rollins – select regular season games

Field reporters
Lauren Shehadi 
Matt Winer
Alanna Rizzo – Pre and Postgame Show – (2021 ALDS and 2021 ALCS)
Hazel Mae – Pre and Postgame Show – (2021 ALDS)

Studio hosts
Ernie Johnson – Wild Card Game and NLDS
Bob Costas – NLCS

Studio analysts
Jimmy Rollins
Pedro Martínez
Curtis Granderson – analyst for select regular season games

2022 personalities

Play-by-play
Brian Anderson 
Bob Costas
Don Orsillo – Select Regular season games

Color commentators
Ron Darling
Jeff Francoeur

Field reporters
Lauren Shehadi – Occasional regular season games and MLB Playoffs
Matt Winer – most regular season games and 2022 ALDS
Heidi Watney
Kelly Crull – Occasional regular season games
Allie LaForce – most regular season games 
Hazel Mae – Occasional regular season games
Jahmai Webster
Meredith Marakovits

Studio hosts
Ernie Johnson 
Lauren Shehadi
Bob Costas – ALCS

Studio analysts
Jimmy Rollins
Pedro Martínez
Curtis Granderson
Matt Holliday – select weeks during regular season
Chase Utley – select weeks during regular season
Dexter Fowler – select weeks during regular season

Announcing teams

In , Don Orsillo and Joe Simpson called the one game playoff between the Colorado Rockies and the San Diego Padres to decide the National League wild card. In , Dick Stockton called the American Central tiebreaker game between the Chicago White Sox and Minnesota Twins with Ron Darling, Harold Reynolds and field reporter Marc Fein. In , Chip Caray, Ron Darling, and field reporter Craig Sager called the one game playoff between the Minnesota Twins and Detroit Tigers for the American League Central title. In , Matt Winer filled in for Lauren Shehadi in Game 5 of the American League Division Series between the Cleveland Guardians and the New York Yankees so Shehadi could host coverage for it instead of Ernie Johnson Jr. after its postponement conflicted with the latter’s NBA on TNT opening night duties.

References

External links
Fang's Bites: TBS Announces 2010 MLB Postseason Roster
Searchable Network TV Broadcasts

Major League Baseball on TBS broadcasters
TBS broadcasters